Azogues is the capital of Azogues Canton and of Cañar Province in Ecuador.
 
The population of Azogues is approximately 40,000.

Azogues is located at 2,518 meters above sea level (8,261 feet), its population is of 39,848 inhabitants, its average temperature is 17 °C (63 °F). It is also known for its Panama hat industry (jipi japa); the hats are produced primarily for export.

It was founded on 4 October 1562, by Gil Ramirez Davalos. Initially part of the old Township of Cuenca, in 1775 it was promoted to parish status.

Religion 
San Francisco Cathedral is the seat of the Roman Catholic Diocese of Azogues (established 1968), split from its present Metropolitan, the Archdiocese of Cuenca.

Transportation 

 Azogues is well connected on land to Cuenca by via rapida Biblian–Azogues–Cuenca; currently being widened to 6 lanes. It connects to Quito via I35 and to Guayaquil via I40, both newly improved branches of the Pan-American Highway.
 Azogues uses Mariscal Lamar Regional Airport located in Cuenca.

Azogues is the capital of the Cañar Province and the second largest city in the Cuenca Metropolitan Area with 700,000 inhabitants.

References

Sources and External links 
 The Best of Ecuador - Cañar
 GCatholic - cathedral, with Google satellite map
 Azogues, Cuenca Property Market Report
 www.azoguenos.com The cyber community of Azogues in the world.
 Azogues Ecuador: An Easy Day Trip From Cuenca

Populated places in Cañar Province
Provincial capitals in Ecuador
Populated places established in 1562
1562 establishments in the Spanish Empire